

S03A Anti-infectives

S03AA Anti-infectives
S03AA01 Neomycin
S03AA02 Tetracycline
S03AA03 Polymyxin B
S03AA04 Chlorhexidine
S03AA05 Hexamidine
S03AA06 Gentamicin
S03AA07 Ciprofloxacin
S03AA08 Chloramphenicol
S03AA30 Antiinfectives, combinations

S03B Corticosteroids

S03BA Corticosteroids
S03BA01 Dexamethasone
S03BA02 Prednisolone
S03BA03 Betamethasone

S03C Corticosteroids and anti-infectives in combination

S03CA Corticosteroids and anti-infectives in combination
S03CA01 Dexamethasone and antiinfectives
S03CA02 Prednisolone and antiinfectives
S03CA04 Hydrocortisone and antiinfectives
S03CA05 Fludrocortisone and antiinfectives
S03CA06 Betamethasone and antiinfectives
S03CA07 Methylprednisolone and antiinfectives

S03D Other ophthalmological and otological preparations
Empty group

References

S03